The FIS Alpine World Ski Championships 2019 were held from 4 to 17 February 2019 in Åre, Sweden. The host city was selected at the FIS Congress in Barcelona, Spain, on 5 June 2014. The only other applicant was Cortina d'Ampezzo, Italy, which later gained the 2021 championships.

Åre previously hosted the world championships in 1954 and 2007, and has held numerous World Cup events.

Schedule and course information

Schedule
Eleven events were held.

All times are local (UTC+1).

Course information

Medal summary

Medal table

Men's events

Women's events

Mixed

Participating countries
As of 5 December 2018, a total of 74 countries are scheduled to compete.

 (5)
 (3)
 (5)
 (2)
 (3) 
 (26)
 (4)
 (6)
 (1)
 (8)
 (3)
 (15)
 (2)
 (13)
 (1)
 (1)
 (8)
 (4)
 (10)
 (5)
 (1)
 (9)
 (24)
 (5)
 (22)
 (1)
 (9)
 (10)
 (2)
 (5)
 (8)
 (1)
 (11)
 (3)
 (2)
 (22)
 (4)
 (1)
 (3)
 (5)
 (4)
 (8)
 (8)
 (3)
 (3)
 (2)
 (4)
 (2)
 (1)
 (3)
 (2)
 (2)
 (2)
 (1)
 (3)
 (5)
 (20)
 (1)
 (1)
 (3)
 (3)
 (9)
 (9)
 (9)
 (14)
 (1)
 (1)
 (5)
 (24) (host nation)
 (24)
 
 (1)
 (1)
 (5)
 (13)
 (1)
 (1)

References

External links

 
2019 in alpine skiing
2019
2019 in Swedish sport
A
Alpine skiing competitions in Sweden
February 2019 sports events in Sweden
Sport in Åre